Kevin Woo (born November 25, 1991), also known mononymously as Kevin, is an American singer-songwriter, actor, and television host based as a Korean in New York City. He is primarily known as a former member of South Korean boy band U-KISS from 2008 until 2017, as well as a host of various programs such as After School Club.

Born and raised in California, he was discovered by South Korean entertainment agency XING Entertainment at the age of 15 and subsequently moved to South Korea. After a few months of training, Woo debuted as a member of boy group XING in 2006. After leaving the group two years later, he re-debuted as a member of U-KISS in August 2008.

In March 2017, he left U-KISS after his contract expired. Following his departure from U-KISS, Woo pursued a solo career in South Korea and Japan; he debuted as a soloist with his first single "Ride Along" in October 2018.

Life and career

1990–2012: Early life and career beginnings
Woo was born and raised in Danville, California, where he lived with his parents and elder sister. His family has a creative background being that his mother was a fashion model in South Korea and his paternal uncle, Emmanuel Woo, was an actor and classical opera singer in Germany. At the age of 15, Woo was initially discovered through a XING Entertainment audition. After he was accepted as a trainee, Woo and his mother moved to South Korea.

After a few months of training, Woo debuted as a first member generation of boy group XING in December 2006. After releasing three singles with the group, Woo left the group in April 2008. Following his departure, Woo signed with NH Media and re-debuted as a member of boy group U-KISS in August 2008.

In February 2009, Woo joined Arirang TV's radio show Pops in Seoul as a host of segment "All About You" alongside co-host Kim Isak.  
In December 2009, Woo with fellow U-KISS member Alexander released a single "Finally", which was composed by Brave Brothers.

In July 2010, Woo with U-KISS members Soohyun, Kibum, Kiseop and Dongho became a part of the drama I Am Legend, acting as a rock band. In August 2010, Woo with fellow members Alexander were selected as the new MCs for Arirang TV's music show The M-Wave.

On January 5, 2011, Woo participated in the musical On Air Live as the lead actor. He acted in a total of 26 shows, his last stage appearance coming on February 14, 2011. On March 17, Woo with U-KISS members Eli and Alexander quit MCing for Arirang's Radio School due to the loss of U-KISS members Alexander and Kibum from the group. On October 12, Woo with U-KISS members Eli announced that they would have a collaboration with Japanese singer JAMOSA from Avex label for her single "Together". The single was released on December 7 and the trio held release events at Lazone Kawasaki Plaza (December 9), Osaka Senri Selcy (December 10) and Asunal Kanayama (December 11). The song "Together" was then selected as the theme song for BeeTV's sweetTV. In November 2011, Woo and bandmate Eli were selected as MCs for Mnet's English-language version of M! Countdown, US M! Countdown.

In 2012, Woo and Soohyun remade UN's "Remember" for the drama Syndrome.

2013–2017: U-KISS uBEAT and television roles
In April 2013, U-KISS' first sub-unit, uBEAT, was formed with Woo and fellow members Eli and AJ. The sub-unit debuted with the release of an EP titled I Should Have Treated You Better with a title track of the same name, which was composed by Brave Brothers. uBEAT made their debut stage at M! Countdown'''s special global edition in Taiwan. Woo alongside bandmates Soohyun, Eli and Kiseop participated in the drama KPOP The Ultimate Audition, having small cameo appearances in three episodes as a senior idol group to the main cast. Woo and Soohyun were selected to appear in the Korean adaptation of the musical Summer Snow alongside Super Junior's Sungmin, Supernova's Sungjae, SS501's Heo Young-saeng and FT Island's Seunghyun from April to June 2013. This was Woo's second musical.

On May 1, 2014, Woo was a guest on music talk show After School Club and from episode 43, he became a co-host alongside Eric Nam, Jae Park and Park Jimin. Woo graduated from the program and left as MC on April 10, 2018, after four years as host.

On March 1, 2017, NH Media announced that Woo would officially leave U-KISS following the expiration of his contract on March 31, 2017. He decided to continue his promotion with U-KISS until mid-April.

 2018–present: Solo career 
Following his departure from U-KISS, Woo signed with Japan Music Entertainment to pursue his solo career in Japan. He also stated that he intended to pursue his career back in the United States. In October 2018, he debuted as a soloist with his single, "Ride Along", which he released in both Japanese and English.

Woo was part of the cast of the Korean adaptation of the musical Altar Boyz from February to March 2019. In July 2019, Woo was featured in British DJ duo Hollaphonic's single "Over You", which marked his first international collaboration. He debuted the song during his set at music festival KCON at its New York dates, fulfilling one of his dreams to perform at Madison Square Garden. He released his first extended play, Treasure, on July 31; it was preceded by its lead single "Freedom", which was Woo's first self-composed song. To promote the album, Woo embarked on his first solo tour, Come Alive Tour, spanning four dates in July and August 2019. Woo and former Royal Pirates bassist James Lee collaborated for the single "Falling", which was released on August 2. The duo promoted the single with a two-date concert tour in Los Angeles and San Francisco on August 24–25, and a music video released in November 6.

Woo joined the Live From Home livestream charity concert held on May 23, where proceeds benefitted the CDC Foundation's crisis fund for the COVID-19 pandemic. Woo temporarily rejoined U-KISS as a duo with Soohyun as part of a special throwback-themed "Guilty Pleasures" concert from SBS and its variety show MMTG in October 2020. The duo also performed "Shut Up!!" with Teen Top in a special collaboration stage. He joined the lineup of the 2nd annual Joy Ruckus Club concert, which was broadcast online on October 17 & 18.

In March 2021, it was announced that survival horror video game Dead by Daylight would feature a K-pop-themed killer called "The Trickster;" Woo was brought on as a consultant for the character's portrayal. He released his debut English single, "Got It", on June 29, through Sony Music Korea. The song was co-produced by Shintaro Yasuda and co-written by Woo. Woo released his first NFTs with KLKTN, an NFT platform where he serves as creative director.

Woo will make his Broadway debut with the K-Pop inspired musical KPOP'', which began previews on October 13, 2022, and opened on November 20 in New York City.

Personal life
In a Japanese survey through popular fortune-telling site Cocoloni, Woo was ranked as the number one luckiest Hallyu star for 2012. 100 fortune-tellers participated in the survey, predicting the stars' fortunes through zodiac, blood type and other methods. When Woo received the news, he stated: "I'm honored to be ranked first. I want to make this really happen this year. U-KISS will go on a Japanese tour and we will also release our album. Please keep supporting us and help us rank first on the Oricon chart."

Woo resided in South Korea until 2021, the year he moved to Los Angeles, California. As of July 30, 2022, Woo currently resides in New York City. He is known to be active in social media, where he regularly posts on Twitter, Instagram, and TikTok.

Discography

Extended plays

Singles

Collaborations

Soundtrack appearances

Filmography

Television dramas

Television shows

Musical theatre

See also
 Koreans in New York City

References

1991 births
Living people
American dance musicians
American expatriates in South Korea
American Internet celebrities
American male pop singers
American musicians of Korean descent
American contemporary R&B singers
American television hosts
American K-pop singers
Musicians from the San Francisco Bay Area
People from Danville, California
South Korean male idols
U-KISS members
Korean-language singers of the United States
21st-century American singers
21st-century South Korean singers
21st-century American male singers